Beauvain is a commune in the Orne department in northwestern France.

Population

See also
Communes of the Orne department
Parc naturel régional Normandie-Maine

References

Communes of Orne